The cream-vented bulbul (Pycnonotus simplex) is a member of the bulbul family of passerine birds. It is found in south-eastern Asia from the Malay Peninsula to Borneo.  Its natural habitat is subtropical or tropical moist lowland forests. Its breast might sometimes look a little yellow.

Taxonomy and systematics

Alternate names for the cream-vented bulbul include the white-eyed brown bulbul and white-eyed bulbul. The latter alternate name is also shared with the white-spectacled bulbul.

Subspecies
Four subspecies are recognized:
 P. s. simplex - Lesson, 1839: Found from Malay Peninsula to Sumatra and nearby islands.
 P. s. perplexus - Chasen & Kloss, 1929: Found on Borneo and nearby islands. White-eyed populations of bulbuls on Borneo formerly thought to belong to this species are now considered a distinct species, the cream-eyed bulbul (P. pseudosimplex).
 P. s. prillwitzi - Hartert, 1902: Originally described as a separate species. Found on Java
 P. s. halizonus - Oberholser, 1917: Found on Anambas and northern Natuna Islands

References

 Smythies, B.E.; & Davison, G.W.H. (1999). The Birds of Borneo. Natural History Publications (Borneo): Kota Kinabalu. 

cream-vented bulbul
Birds of Malesia
cream-vented bulbul
Taxonomy articles created by Polbot